Ornithoctoninae is a subfamily of tarantulas found in Southeast Asia. It was first erected in 1895 by Reginald Innes Pocock based on the type specimen Ornithoctonus andersoni. 

The Ornithoctoninae comprise a theraphosid subfamily, which is widely distributed in Asia from Myanmar to South China in the north and as far as to Halmahera in the Indonesian archipelago in the south, and in all the ranges in between. Most species in the subfamily live fossorially in burrows, though several species live arboreally.  They are known as defensive spiders; when disturbed, they quickly retreat into their burrows or dig themselves into the soil.  When neither is a possibility, they assume a defensive posture.  When provoked, they strike the aggressor repeatedly with the anterior legs; if the aggressor does not retreat, these spiders have been known to bite. Though not deadly, the effects of the venom can be very unpleasant, including pain, swelling, and arthritis-like stiffness in the joints of the extremity affected.

The theraphosid subfamily Ornithoctoninae is defined by a combination of characteristics: Presence of retrolateral scopula of filiform setae on the cheliceral base, a small row of larger filiform paddle setae retrolaterally ventrobasally in connection to the retrolateral cheliceral scopula, and arrangement of stridulatory spines prolaterally on maxilla. The characteristic of retrolateral scopula of filiform setae on the cheliceral base is shared by the African subfamily Harpactirinae, but the Ornithoctoninae can be distinguished from the Harpactirinae by the geographic distribution range and the presence of the other characteristics mentioned, which are lacking in the Harpactirinae.

As pets 
Specimens from the genera Haplopelma, Cyriopagopus, and Ornithoctonus  are frequently kept as pets. The most commonly kept species are: H. albostriatum, H. hainanum, H. lividum, H. longipes, H. minax, H. schmidti, O. aureotibialis, and C. schioedtei. More species are kept and new species enter the hobby every now and then, but most of this material needs to be properly identified or described.

Genera and species of  Ornithoctoninae
A list of known species in the Ornithoctoninae, sorted by genera:

Citharognathus (Pocock, 1895)
Type species: C. hosei

Citharognathus hosei (Pocock, 1895) — Borneo
Citharognathus tongmianensis (Zhu, Li & Song, 2002) — China

Cyriopagopus (Simon, 1887) [Senior synonym of Melognathus {Chamberlin, 1917}]
Type species: C. paganus

Cyriopagopus dromeus (Chamberlin) — Philippines
Cyriopagopus paganus (Simon, 1887) — Myanmar
Cyriopagopus thorelli (Simon, 1901) — Malaysia

Haplopelma (Simon, 1892) [Senior synonym of Melopoeus {Pocock, 1895}]
Type species: Haplopelma doriae

Transferred to other genera:
Haplopelma chrysothrix (Schmidt & Samm, 2005) → Ornithoctonus aureotibialis
Haplopelma costale → Ornithoctonus costalis

In synonymy:
Haplopelma huwenum (Wang, Peng & Xie, 1993) = Haplopelma schmidti

Haplopelma albostriatum (Simon, 1886) — Myanmar, Thailand, Cambodia, the Thai zebra
Haplopelma doriae (Thorell, 1890) — Borneo
Haplopelma hainanum (Liang et al., 1999) — China [Hainan Island], the Chinese {Hainan Island} black earth tiger
Haplopelma lividum (Smith, 1996) — Myanmar, Thailand, the [Myanmarian] cobalt blue
Haplopelma longipes (Von Wirth & Striffler, 2005) — Myanmar, the [Myanmarian] Vietnamese earth tiger
Haplopelma minax (Thorell, 1897) — Myanmar, Thailand, the Thai black
Haplopelma robustum (Strand, 1907) — Singapore, the Singaporean gold ring black and gray earth tiger
Haplopelma salangense (Strand, 1907) — Malaysia
Haplopelma schmidti (Von Wirth, 1991) — Vietnam, China, the [Vietnamese] Chinese gold earth tiger
Haplopelma vonwirthi (Schmidt, 2005) — Vietnam

Lampropelma (Simon, 1892)
Type species: L. nigerrimum

Lampropelma kirki (Simon, 1892) — Indonesia, the Sangihe Island black
Lampropelma nigerrimum (Simon, 1892) — Indonesia, the Sangihe Island black

Omothymus (Simon, 1892)
Type species: Omothymus schioedtei

Omothymus fuchsi (Strand, 1906) – Indonesia (Sumatra)
Omothymus rafni Gabriel & Sherwood - Indonesia
Omothymus schioedtei Thorell, 1891 – Malaysia
Omothymus violaceopes (Abraham, 1924) — Malaysia, Singapore, the Singapore[an] blue

Ornithoctonus (Pocock, 1892)
Type species: O. andersoni

Transferred to other genera:
Ornithoctonus gadgili (Tikader, 1977) → Poecilotheria regalis
Ornithoctonus hainanus → Haplopelma hainanum
Ornithoctonus huwenus (Wang, Peng & Xie, 1993) → Haplopelma schmidti

Ornithoctonus andersoni (Pocock, 1892) — Myanmar, the [Myanmarian] Asian mahogany mustard
Ornithoctonus aureotibialis (Von Wirth & Striffler, 2005) — Thailand, the Thai gold fringed'
Ornithoctonus costalis (Schmidt, 1998) — Thailand

Phormingochilus (Pocock, 1895)
Type species: P. everetti

Transferred to other genera:
Phormingochilus carpenteri Smith & Jacobi, 2015 → Lampropelma carpenteri
Phormingochilus fuchsi Strand, 1906 → Omothymus fuchsi
Phormingochilus kirki Smith & Jacobi, 2015 → Lampropelma kirki

Phormingochilus arboricola (Schmidt & Barensteiner) – Borneo
Phormingochilus everetti (Pocock, 1895) — Borneo
Phormingochilus pennellhewlettorum Smith & Jacobi, 2015 — Borneo
Phormingochilus tigrinus (Pocock, 1895) — Borneo

References 
 Smith, A.M. & M.A. Jacobi (2015): Revision of the genus Phormingochilus with the description of three new species from Sulawesi and Sarawak and notes on the placement of the genera Cyriopagopus, Lampropelma and Omothymus. British Tarantula Society Journal 30(3): 25-48.
 von Wirth, V. & M. Huber (2002): Einige Praxis-Tipps zur Haltung von Haplopelma Arten und anderen Röhren bewohnenden Vogelspinnen.  DeArGe Mitteilungen 7(11): 14-23. (German)
 von Wirth, V. & M. Huber (2003): Earth Tigers – die asiatischen Vogelspinnen der Unterfamilie Ornithoctoninae. DRACO 4(16): 26-36. (German)
 von Wirth, V. & M. Huber (2004): Housing specimens of Haplopelma and other tube-dwelling tarantulas. BTS Journal 19(4): 107-112.
 von Wirth, V. & Boris Striffler (2005): Neue Erkenntnisse zur Vogelspinnen – Unterfamilie Ornithoctoninae, mit Beschreibung von Ornithoctonus aureotibialis sp. n. und Haplopelma longipes sp. n. (Araneae, Theraphosidae). Arthropoda 13(2): 2-27. (German)
 Norman I. Platnick: The World Spider Catalog, American Museum of Natural History.

External links
Deutsche Arachnologische Gesellschaft e. V. - the world's largest arachnid (mainly tarantulas) society (club journal: ARACHNE - ISSN 1613-2688)
Gallery of tarantulas

Theraphosidae
Spider subfamilies